Honington could refer to:

Honington, Lincolnshire
Honington, Suffolk
Honington, Warwickshire
RAF Honington in Suffolk